Broussais Coman Beck (1886-1936) was a Seattle businessperson and Bon Marche manager who played a notable role in the use of aggressive tactics to disrupt the efforts of labor unions and activists during the 1919 Seattle General Strike, in particular, employing labor spies to obtain advance information on planned actions. Beck also contributed to developing rowing as a recognized sport at the University of Washington, as well as helping to introduce the sport at Yale University and University of California.

External links 
 Selections from the University of Washington Digital Collections on Broussais Coman Beck

Archival Sources 

 Broussais C. Beck Papers, 1919–1961, 2.93 cubic feet including microfilm (5 boxes)  at the Labor Archives of Washington, University of Washington Libraries Special Collections

1886 births
1936 deaths
Labor relations in the United States
Businesspeople from Seattle
20th-century American businesspeople